Andreas Findig (4 August 1961 in Linz, Austria – 7 May 2018) was a writer who won a Deutscher Science Fiction Preis for the short story Gödel geht. He died on 6 May 2018 aged 56.

References 

1961 births
2018 deaths
Austrian male writers
Austrian science fiction writers
Writers from Linz